Anna Gawrońska was a Polish football striker, playing for Medyk Konin in the Ekstraliga and serving as the team's captain. She was the championship's top scorer in 2006 and 2008.

She has been a member of the Polish national team since 2002.

After retiring from an active career she began working as a coach. In January 2011, together with Nina Patalon, she became the head coach of Medyk Konin's. first team.

References

1979 births
Living people
Polish women's footballers
Medyk Konin players
Female association football managers
Place of birth missing (living people)
Poland women's international footballers
Women's association football forwards
Polish football managers